The Park at East Hills is a village-owned park in East Hills, in Nassau County, on the North Shore of Long Island, in New York, United States. It is exclusively open to East Hills residents and their guests.

Description 
The Park at East Hills opened on Labor Day in 2006. It sits on land previously occupied by the Roslyn Air National Guard Station. It is open exclusively to residents of East Hills and their guests, and park cards are required for entry.

The transformation of the facility, which the Village of East Hills purchased from the United States Government following the closure of the station, cost approximately $7,000,000.

References

External links 

 Village of East Hills official website

Parks in Nassau County, New York